Sarah Escobar (born February 1, 2002) is an American skier who competes for Ecuador.

Biography
Sarah Escobar is the daughter of two Ecuadorians, Eleana and Fabian Escobar. They immigrated to the United States for a better life.

Early life and education
Escobar learned to ski when she was three and a half years old. She was attracted to the sport because her older brother was a skilled skier. 

When she was nine years old, Escobar began competing in her home state of New Jersey. Shortly afterward, she started training at Waterville Valley Academy, a ski academy in Waterville Valley, New Hampshire, to improve her skills.

Escobar attends Saint Michael's College in Vermont, USA, where she studies psychology. She also belongs to the St. Michael's ski team. She expects to graduate in 2025.

Career
In 2020, Escobar became the first Ecuadorian to participate in the Winter Youth Olympics when she competed in Lausanne. She was part of the slalom, giant slalom, super-G, and combined events.

Escobar was the sole athlete representing Ecuador at the 2022 Winter Olympics in Beijing. She was also the first woman to represent Ecuador at the Winter Olympics. She competed in the giant slalom event, placing 60th in the first round. She was unable to complete the second round. Escobar said, "I am very excited and proud to represent Ecuadorian women my age and my country."

References

2002 births
Living people
Ecuadorian female alpine skiers
American female alpine skiers
Female Olympic competitors
People from Sparta, New Jersey
Sportspeople from Sussex County, New Jersey
Olympic alpine skiers of Ecuador
Alpine skiers at the 2022 Winter Olympics
Alpine skiers at the 2020 Winter Youth Olympics